27th London Film Critics Circle Awards
8 February 2007

Film of the Year: 
 United 93 

British Film of the Year: 
 The Queen 

The 27th London Film Critics Circle Awards, honouring the best in film for 2006, were announced by the London Film Critics Circle on 8 February 2007.

Winners and nominees

Film of the Year
United 93
The Departed
Little Miss Sunshine
The Queen
Volver

British Film of the Year
The Queen
Children of Men
The Last King of Scotland
Red Road
The Wind That Shakes the Barley

Foreign Language Film of the Year
Volver • SpainApocalypto • United States
Black Book • Netherlands
The Death of Mr. Lazarescu • Romania
L'Enfant • Belgium
Pan's Labyrinth • Mexico

Director of the YearPaul Greengrass – United 93 Pedro Almodóvar – Volver
Alfonso Cuaron – Children of Men
Guillermo del Toro – Pan's Labyrinth
Martin Scorsese – The Departed

British Director of the YearStephen Frears – The Queen Andrea Arnold – Red Road
Ken Loach – The Wind That Shakes the Barley
Kevin Macdonald – The Last King of Scotland
Christopher Nolan – The Prestige

Screenwriter of the YearPeter Morgan – The Queen Dan Futterman – Capote
Michael Arndt – Little Miss Sunshine
Guillermo del Toro – Pan's Labyrinth
Noah Baumbach – The Squid and the Whale

Actor of the YearForest Whitaker – The Last King of Scotland Jeff Daniels – The Squid and the Whale
Richard Griffiths – The History Boys
Philip Seymour Hoffman – Capote
David Strathairn – Good Night, and Good Luck

Actress of the YearMeryl Streep – The Devil Wears Prada
Joan Allen – The Upside of Anger
Penélope Cruz – Volver
Judi Dench – Notes on a Scandal
Helen Mirren – The Queen

British Actor of the Year
Toby Jones – Infamous 
Christian Bale – The Prestige
Sacha Baron Cohen – Borat
James McAvoy – The Last King of Scotland
Timothy Spall – Pierrepoint

British Actress of the Year
Helen Mirren – The Queen 
Judi Dench – Notes on a Scandal
Kate Dickie – Red Road
Lorraine Stanley – London to Brighton
Kate Winslet – Little Children

British Supporting Actor of the Year
Michael Caine – The Prestige
Dominic Cooper – The History Boys
Eddie Marsan – Pierrepoint
Bill Nighy – Notes on a Scandal
Leslie Phillips – Venus

British Supporting Actress of the Year
Emily Blunt – The Devil Wears Prada 
Helen McCrory – The Queen
Juliet Stevenson – Pierrepoint
Emma Thompson – Stranger Than Fiction
Emily Watson – The Proposition

British Newcomer of the Year
Andrea Arnold – Red Road
Clare-Hope Ashitey – Children of Men
Rebecca Hall – The Prestige
Jodie Whittaker – Venus
Paul Andrew Williams – London to Brighton

British Producer of the Year
Paul Greengrass, Eric Fellner, Tim Bevan – United 93
Graham King – The Departed
Lisa Bryer, Andrea Calderwood, Charles Steel – The Last King of Scotland
Alastair Clark, Ken Marshall, Rachel Robey, Paul Andrew Williams – London to Brighton
Rebecca O'Brien – The Wind That Shakes the Barley

Dilys Powell Award
Leslie Phillips

Distinguished Service to the Arts
Helen Mirren

References

2
2006 film awards
2006 in London
2006 in British cinema